John Fisher (c. 19 October 1469 – 22 June 1535) was an English Catholic bishop, cardinal, and theologian. Fisher was also an academic and Chancellor of the University of Cambridge. He was canonized by Pope Pius XI.

Fisher was executed by order of Henry VIII during the English Reformation for refusing to accept him as the supreme head of the Church of England and for upholding the Catholic Church's doctrine of papal supremacy. He was named a cardinal shortly before his death. He is honoured as a martyr and saint by the Catholic Church. He shares his feast day with Thomas More on 22 June in the Catholic calendar of saints and on 6 July in that of the Church of England.

Early life
John Fisher was born in Beverley, Yorkshire, in 1469, the eldest son of Robert Fisher, a modestly prosperous merchant of Beverley, and Agnes, his wife. He was one of four children. His father died when John was eight. His mother remarried and had five more children by her second husband, William White. Fisher seems to have had close contacts with his extended family all his life. Fisher's early education was probably received in the school attached to the collegiate church in his home town.

Fisher studied at the University of Cambridge from 1484, where at Michaelhouse he came under the influence of William Melton, a pastorally-minded theologian open to the new current of reform in studies arising from the Renaissance. Fisher earned a Bachelor of Arts degree in 1487 and in 1491 proceeded to a Master of Arts degree. Also in 1491 Fisher received a papal dispensation to enter the priesthood despite being under canonical age. Fisher was ordained into the priesthood on 17 December 1491 – the same year that he was elected a fellow of his college. He was also made Vicar of Northallerton, Yorkshire. In 1494 he resigned his benefice to become proctor of the university and three years later was appointed master debater, about which date he also became chaplain and confessor to Margaret Beaufort, Countess of Richmond and Derby, mother of King Henry VII. On 5 July 1501, he became a doctor of sacred theology and 10 days later was elected Vice-Chancellor of the university. Under Fisher's guidance, his patroness Lady Margaret founded St John's and Christ's Colleges at Cambridge, and a Lady Margaret Professorship of Divinity at each of the two universities at Oxford and Cambridge, Fisher himself becoming the first occupant of the Cambridge chair. From 1505 to 1508 he was also the President of Queens' College. At the end of July 1516 he was at Cambridge for the opening of St John's College and consecrated the chapel.

Fisher's strategy was to assemble funds and attract to Cambridge leading scholars from Europe, promoting the study not only of Classical Latin and Greek authors, but of Hebrew. He placed great weight upon pastoral commitment, above all popular preaching by the endowed staff. Fisher's foundations were also dedicated to prayer for the dead, especially through chantry foundations. Fisher had a vision to which he dedicated all his personal resources and energies. A scholar and a priest, humble and conscientious, he managed despite occasional opposition to administer a whole university, one of only two in England. He conceived and saw through long-term projects.

A stern and austere man, Fisher was known to place a human skull on the altar during Mass and on the table during meals.

Erasmus said of John Fisher: "He is the one man at this time who is incomparable for uprightness of life, for learning and for greatness of soul."

Bishop
By papal bull dated 14 October 1504, Fisher was appointed the bishop of Rochester at the personal insistence of Henry VII. Rochester was then the poorest diocese in England and usually seen as a first step on an ecclesiastical career. Nonetheless, Fisher stayed there, presumably by his own choice, for the remaining 31 years of his life. At the same time, like any English bishop of his day, Fisher had certain state duties. In particular, he maintained a passionate interest in the University of Cambridge. In 1504 he was elected the university's chancellor. Re-elected annually for 10 years, Fisher ultimately received a lifetime appointment. At this date he is also said to have acted as tutor to the future king, Henry VIII. As a preacher his reputation was so great that Fisher was appointed to preach the funeral oration for King Henry VII and the Lady Margaret, both of whom died in 1509, the texts being extant. Besides his share in the Lady Margaret's foundations, Fisher gave further proof of his zeal for learning by inducing Erasmus to visit Cambridge. The latter attributes it ("Epistulae" 6:2) to Fisher's protection that the study of Greek was allowed to proceed at Cambridge without the active molestation that it encountered at Oxford.

Despite his fame and eloquence, it was not long before Fisher came into conflict with the new King, his former pupil. The dispute arose over funds left by the Lady Margaret, the King's grandmother, for financing foundations at Cambridge.

In 1512 Fisher was nominated as one of the English representatives at the Fifth Council of the Lateran, then sitting, but his journey to Rome was postponed, and finally abandoned.

Fisher has also been named, though without any real proof, as the true author of the royal treatise against Martin Luther entitled "Assertio septem sacramentorum" (Defence of the Seven Sacraments), published in 1521, which won for King Henry VIII the title "Fidei Defensor" (Defender of the Faith). Prior to this date Fisher had denounced various abuses in the church, urging the need for disciplinary reforms. On about 11 February 1526, at the King's command, he preached a famous sermon against Luther at St Paul's Cross, the open-air pulpit outside St Paul's Cathedral in London. This was in the wake of numerous other controversial writings; the battle against heterodox teachings increasingly occupied Fisher's later years. In 1529 Fisher ordered the arrest of Thomas Hitton, a follower of William Tyndale, and subsequently interrogated him. Hitton was tortured and executed at the stake for heresy.

Defence of Catherine of Aragon
When Henry tried to annul his marriage to Catherine of Aragon, Fisher became the Queen's chief supporter. As such, he appeared on the Queen's behalf in the legates' court, where he startled the audience by the directness of his language and by declaring that, like St John the Baptist, he was ready to die on behalf of the indissolubility of marriage. Henry VIII, upon hearing this, grew so enraged by it that he composed a long Latin address to the legates in answer to the bishop's speech. Fisher's copy of this still exists, with his manuscript annotations in the margin which show how little he feared the royal anger. The removal of the cause to Rome brought Fisher's personal involvement to an end, but the King never forgave him for what he had done.

Henry's attack on the Church
In November 1529, the "Long Parliament" of Henry's reign began encroaching on the Catholic Church's prerogatives. Fisher, as a member of the upper house, the House of Lords, at once warned Parliament that such acts could only end in the utter destruction of the Catholic Church in England. The Commons, through their speaker, complained to the King that Fisher had disparaged Parliament, presumably with Henry prompting them behind the scenes. The opportunity was not lost. Henry summoned Fisher before him, demanding an explanation. This being given, Henry declared himself satisfied, leaving it to the Commons to declare that the explanation was inadequate, so that he appeared as a magnanimous sovereign, instead of Fisher's enemy.

A year later, in 1530, the continued encroachments on the Church moved Fisher, as bishop of Rochester, along with the bishops of Bath and Ely, to appeal to the Holy See. This gave the King his opportunity and an edict forbidding such appeals was immediately issued, and the three bishops were arrested. Their imprisonment, however, must have lasted only a few months for in February 1531, Convocation met, and Fisher was present. This was the occasion when the clergy were forced, at a cost of 100,000 pounds, to purchase the King's pardon for having recognized Cardinal Wolsey's authority as legate of the pope; and at the same time to acknowledge Henry as supreme head of the Church in England, to which phrase the addition of the clause "so far as God's law permits" was made through Fisher's efforts.

A few days later, several of Fisher's servants were taken ill after eating some porridge served to the household and two died. A cook, Richard Roose, was executed by boiling alive for attempted poisoning.

Intrigues with the Holy Roman Emperor
Fisher also engaged in secret activities to overthrow Henry. As early as 1531 he began secretly communicating with foreign diplomats. In September 1533 communicating secretly through the imperial ambassador Eustace Chapuys he encouraged Holy Roman Emperor Charles V to invade England and depose Henry in combination with a domestic uprising.

"The King's Great Matter"

Matters now moved rapidly.  In May 1532, Sir Thomas More resigned the chancellorship and, in June, Fisher preached publicly against the annulment.  In August, William Warham, Archbishop of Canterbury, died and Thomas Cranmer was at once proposed by Henry to the Pope as his successor.  In January of the next year, Henry secretly went through a form of marriage with Anne Boleyn.  Cranmer's consecration as a bishop took place in March 1533, and, a week later, Fisher was arrested.  It seems that the purpose of this arrest was to prevent him from opposing the annulment which Cranmer pronounced in May, or the coronation of Anne Boleyn which followed on 1 June, for Fisher was set at liberty again within a fortnight of the latter event, no charge being made against him.  In the autumn of 1533, various arrests were made in connection with the so-called revelations of the Holy Maid of Kent, Elizabeth Barton, but as Fisher was taken seriously ill in December, proceedings against him were postponed for a time.  However, in March 1534, a special Bill of Attainder against Fisher and others for complicity in the matter of the Maid of Kent was introduced in Parliament and passed.  By this, Fisher was condemned to forfeit all his personal estate and to be imprisoned during the King's pleasure.  Subsequently, a pardon was granted him on payment of a fine of 300 pounds.

The same session of Parliament passed the First Succession Act, by which all who should be called upon to do so were compelled to take an oath of succession, acknowledging the issue of Henry and Anne as legitimate heirs to the throne, under pain of being guilty of misprision of treason.  Fisher refused the oath and was imprisoned in the Tower of London on 26 April 1534. Several efforts were made to induce him to submit, but without effect, and in November he was attained of misprision of treason a second time, his goods being forfeited as from the previous 1 March, and the See of Rochester being declared vacant as of 2 June following.  He was to remain in the Tower for over a year, and while he was allowed food and drink sent by friends, and a servant, he was not allowed a priest, even to the very end.  A long letter exists, written from the Tower by Fisher to Thomas Cromwell, speaking of the severity of his conditions of imprisonment.

Like Thomas More, Bishop Fisher believed that, because the statute condemned only those speaking maliciously against the King's new title, there was safety in silence. However, on 7 May he fell into a trap laid for him by Richard Rich, who was to perjure himself to obtain Thomas More's conviction. Rich told Fisher that for his own conscience's sake the King wished to know, in strict secrecy, Fisher's real opinion. Fisher, once again, declared that the King was not Supreme Head of the Church of England.

Cardinalate and martyrdom

In May 1535, the newly elected Pope Paul III created Fisher Cardinal Priest of San Vitale, apparently in the hope of inducing Henry to ease Fisher's treatment. The effect was precisely the reverse: Henry forbade the cardinal's hat to be brought into England, declaring that he would send the head to Rome instead. In June a special commission for Fisher's trial was issued, and on Thursday, 17 June, he was arraigned in Westminster Hall before a court of seventeen, including Thomas Cromwell, Anne Boleyn's father, and ten justices. The charge was treason, in that he denied that the King was the Supreme Head of the Church of England. Since he had been deprived of his position of Bishop of Rochester by the Act of Attainder, he was treated as a commoner, and tried by jury. The only testimony was that of Richard Rich. John Fisher was found guilty and condemned to be hanged, drawn and quartered at Tyburn.

However, a public outcry was brewing among the London populace who saw a sinister irony in the parallels between the conviction of Fisher and that of his patronal namesake, Saint John the Baptist, who was executed by King Herod Antipas for challenging the validity of Herod's marriage to his brother's divorcée Herodias. For fear of John Fisher's living through his patronal feast day, that of the Nativity of St. John the Baptist on 24 June, and of attracting too much public sympathy, King Henry commuted the sentence to that of beheading, to be accomplished before 23 June, the Vigil of the feast of the Nativity of St. John the Baptist. He was executed on Tower Hill on 22 June 1535. The execution had the opposite effect from that which King Henry VIII intended, as it created yet another parallel with that of the martyrdom of St. John the Baptist, who was also beheaded; his death also happened on the feast day of Saint Alban, the first martyr of Britain.

Fisher's last moments were in keeping with his life. He met death with a calm dignified courage which profoundly impressed those present. His body was treated with particular rancour, apparently on Henry's orders, being stripped and left on the scaffold until the evening, when it was taken on pikes and thrown naked into a rough grave in the churchyard of All Hallows' Barking, also known as All Hallows-by-the-Tower. There was no funeral prayer. A fortnight later, his body was laid beside that of Sir Thomas More in the chapel of St Peter ad Vincula within the Tower of London. Fisher's head was stuck upon a pole on London Bridge but its ruddy and lifelike appearance excited so much attention that, after a fortnight, it was thrown into the Thames, its place being taken by that of Sir Thomas More, whose execution, also at Tower Hill, occurred on 6 July.

Canonisation

Fisher was beatified by Pope Leo XIII with Thomas More and 52 other English Martyrs on 29 December 1886. In the Decree of Beatification, the greatest place was given to Fisher.

He was canonised, with Thomas More, on 19 May 1935 by Pope Pius XI, after the presentation of a petition by English Catholics. His feast day, for celebration jointly with St Thomas More, is on 22 June (the date of Fisher's execution). In 1980, despite being an opponent of the English Reformation, Fisher was added to the Church of England's calendar of Saints and Heroes of the Christian Church, jointly with Thomas More, to be commemorated every 6 July (the date of More's execution) as "Thomas More, Scholar, and John Fisher, Bishop of Rochester, Reformation Martyrs, 1535". He is also listed along with Thomas More in the calendar of saints of some of the other Churches of the Anglican Communion, such as The Anglican Church of Australia.

Portraits
Several portraits of Fisher exist, the most prominent being by Hans Holbein the Younger in the Royal Collection; and a few secondary relics are extant.

Relic
Fisher's walking-staff is in the possession of the Eyston family of East Hendred, in Oxfordshire (formerly Berkshire).

Cinematic and television portrayals
John Fisher was portrayed by veteran actor Joseph O'Conor in the film Anne of the Thousand Days (1969), by Bosco Hogan in the miniseries The Tudors, by Geoffrey Lewis in the 1971 miniseries The Six Wives of Henry VIII and by Richard Durden in the 2015 miniseries Wolf Hall.

Writings
A list of Fisher's writings is found in Joseph Gillow's Bibliographical Dictionary of the English Catholics (London, s.d.), II, 262–270. There are twenty-six works in all, printed and manuscript, mostly ascetical or controversial treatises, several of which have been reprinted many times. The original editions are very rare and valuable. The principal are:

  (London, 1508)
  (London, 1521)
  (Cologne, 1525)
  (Cologne, 1527)
  (Alcalá de Henares, 1530)
  (London, 1535)
  (London, 1735)

Patronage

Australia
 St John Fisher College at the University of Tasmania in Hobart
 St John Fisher Catholic High school in Bracken Ridge, Queensland
St John Fisher Church (Tarragindi), Brisbane, Queensland

Canada
 St. John Fisher Catholic School, Scarborough 
 Fisher Hall, one of the residence halls at Saint Michael's College at the University of Toronto
 St. John Fisher R.C. School, Forest, Ontario
 St. John Fisher Parish, Bramalea (Brampton), Ontario
 St. John Fisher Elementary School, Pointe-Claire, Quebec

United Kingdom
 The University of Cambridge:
Fisher House, the Cambridge University Catholic Chaplaincy.
 Fisher Building, a student accommodation at Queens' College, where Fisher was president from 1505 to 1508
The Fisher Building, conference centre and meeting rooms in St John's College
Schools:
St John Fisher Catholic College in Newcastle-under-Lyme, Staffordshire
St John Fisher Catholic High School in Harrogate, North Yorkshire
St John Fisher Catholic High School in Peterborough, Cambridgeshire.
St John Fisher Catholic High School, Wigan, Lancashire
St John Fisher Catholic School in Chatham, Kent.
St John Fisher Catholic Voluntary Academy in Dewsbury, West Yorkshire
Ss John Fisher and Thomas More Roman Catholic High School, Colne, Lancashire
The John Fisher School located in Purley, Surrey
Churches:
Saint John Fisher parish, Kidbrooke, London
Saint John Fisher Roman Catholic Church, Harrow, London
Saint John Fisher Roman Catholic Church, Shepperton, London
Saint John Fisher Roman Catholic Church, Rochester, Kent
John Fisher R.C Church, Scarthoe, Great Grimsby, Lincolnshire. (Closed 2017)
Saint John Fisher R.C. Church, Priory Crescent, Southend on Sea, Essex
Saint John Fisher Church, Cambourne, Cambridgeshire
Other:
St John Fisher House, Reading – the headquarters of the FSSP in England and Wales.
The football teams Fisher Athletic F.C. (1908–2009) and Fisher F.C. (founded 2009) of Rotherhithe, south-east London

United States
Due to his status as the Bishop of Rochester, Fisher has been adopted as a patron of several institutions in other cities named Rochester, including St. John Fisher University and Saint John of Rochester Catholic Church in the Rochester, New York area, and Saint John Fisher Catholic Church near Rochester, Michigan. Fisher is also the patron of the Roman Catholic Diocese of Rochester in New York State, so named by Pope John XXIII in 1961.
 A number of parishes are dedicated to St. John Fisher including those in: Chicago, Illinois; Auburn Hills, Michigan; Cincinnati, Ohio; Boothwyn, Pennsylvania, Galveston, Texas, Rancho Palos Verdes, California, and Portland, Oregon, 
 St. John Fisher Seminary Residence is located in the Catholic Diocese of Bridgeport, Connecticut.
 St John Fisher Catholic Church in Tulsa, Oklahoma and one near Pittsburgh, Pennsylvania.
 Saint John Fisher Church, Newtown, Ohio
 St John Fisher Catholic Church in Marlborough, Connecticut.

References

Further reading
 Edward Surtz, "The Works and Days of John Fisher," Boston: Harvard University Press, 1967.
 E.E. Reynolds, "Saint John Fisher," Wheathampstead: Anthony Clarke, 1972.
 "Humanism, Reform and the Reformation: The Career of Bishop John Fisher," edited by B. Bradshaw & Eamon Duffy, Cambridge University Press, 1989.
 Richard Rex, "The Theology of John Fisher," Cambridge University Press
 "The English Works of John Fisher, Bishop of Rochester (1469–1535): Sermons and other Writings, 1520–1535," edited by Cecilia A. Hatt, Oxford University Press, 2002.
 Vincent Nichols, "St John Fisher: Bishop and Theologian in Reformation and Controversy", Alive Publishing, 2011/
 
 Entry in the Catholic Encyclopedia
 Thomas Cromwell, the rise and fall of Henry VIII's most notorious minister by Robert Hutchinson

External links

 John Fisher and Thomas More: Martyrs of England and Wales
 
 
 

1460s births
1535 deaths
16th-century Christian saints
16th-century English writers
16th-century male writers
16th-century English cardinals
16th-century Roman Catholic martyrs
Bishops of Rochester
Burials at the Church of St Peter ad Vincula
Chancellors of the University of Cambridge
Christian martyrs executed by decapitation
English Renaissance humanists
English Roman Catholic saints
Executions at the Tower of London
Martyred Roman Catholic bishops
People educated at Beverley Grammar School
People executed by Tudor England by decapitation
People executed under Henry VIII
Executed people from Berkshire
People executed under the Tudors for treason against England
People from Beverley
Presidents of Queens' College, Cambridge
Vice-Chancellors of the University of Cambridge
Yorkshire saints
Catholic martyrs of England and Wales
Lady Margaret's Professors of Divinity
Anglican saints